The 2012 Great West Conference men's basketball tournament was held March 8–10, 2012, in Chicago Illinois. at the Emil and Patricia Jones Convocation Center.  Per NCAA regulations as a new Division I conference, the Great West champion did not receive an automatic bid into the NCAA tournament.  The winner however received an automatic bid to the CollegeInsider.com Tournament.

Format
With South Dakota joining the Summit League for the 2011-12 season, a new format was used for the 2012 tournament.

5 teams qualified for the 2012 Great West tournament. Chicago State did not compete in the 2012 Great West tournament due to failing to meet the NCAA's Academic Progress Rate requirements, leading to a postseason ban.

Bracket
* – Denotes overtime period

The entire tournament was streamed online by Sidearm Sports at http://www.gocsucougars.com/showcase/#liveevents.

Game Summaries

References

Great West Conference men's basketball tournament
-2012 Great West Conference Menand#39;s Basketball Tournament